Aretis was the anaboleus riding-servant of Alexander the Great in the battle of Granicus.

References
Who's who in the age of Alexander the Great: prosopography of Alexander's empire  

Soldiers of Alexander the Great
4th-century BC people